Petra Hinze (born 20 April 1955 in Aue) is a former East German cross-country skier who competed during the 1970s starting for SC Traktor Oberwiesenthal. She won a silver medal in the 4 × 5 km relay at the 1974 FIS Nordic World Ski Championships in Falun. She retired from skiing in 1975.

Cross-country skiing results

World Championships
 1 medal – (1 silver)

External links
World Championship results 

Living people
1955 births
German female cross-country skiers
People from Erzgebirgskreis
FIS Nordic World Ski Championships medalists in cross-country skiing
Sportspeople from Saxony